The fifth and final season of The Secret Life of the American Teenager, an American television series created by Brenda Hampton, debuted on the ABC Family television network on Monday, June 11, 2012 at 8:00 PM. During its fourth season's hiatus, ABC Family announced on February 2, 2012, that the show would be renewed for a fifth season. The fifth season premiered on June 11, 2012, one week after the season 4 finale.

On October 10, 2012, the network announced this will be the series' final season.

Cast

Main
 Shailene Woodley as Amy Juergens
Ken Baumann as Ben Boykewich
 Greg Finley as Jack Pappas
 Daren Kagasoff as Ricky Underwood
 Megan Park as Grace Bowman
 Francia Raisa as Adrian Lee
 Steve Schirripa as Leo Boykewich

Special Guest Stars

 Mark Derwin as George Juergens
 Josie Bissett as Kathleen Bowman
 Molly Ringwald as Anne Juergens
 India Eisley as Ashley Juergens

Recurring

 Renee Olstead as Madison Cooperstein
 Camille Winbush as Lauren Treacy
 Anne Ramsay as Nora Underwood
 Michael Grant as Ethan
 Cierra Ramirez as Kathy
 Allen Evangelista as Henry Miller
 Amy Rider as Alice Valko
 Luke Zimmerman as Tom Bowman
 L. Scott Caldwell as Margaret Shakur
 Ana Mackenzie as Dylan
 Marielle Jaffe as Clementine

Episodes

References

External links
Official website

2012 American television seasons
2013 American television seasons
5